Narippatta
is a village and a Grama Panchayath in the north of Kozhikode district, Kerala, India.

Politics
Narippatta is a part of Nadapuram assembly constituency, which is part of Vatakara (Lok Sabha constituency)

Member of Grama Panchayath ( 2015-2020)

Hospitals
 Primary Health Centre Narippatta(Arayakkool)

Educational institutions
 GOVERNMENT ITI NARIPPATTA-(Kaiveli-vallithara)
 RNMHSS Narippatta (Transformer mukku)
GSTS LP school thinoor (mullambath)
 Cheekkonnu UP school (kaiveli)
 Nambyathamkund LP School
 Narippatta UP School (Kuniya poyil School)
 Narippatta MLP School (Palliyath School Thazhe Narippatta)
 Narippatta North LP School ( Orappil School Thazhe Narippatta)
 Narippatta South LP School ( Manniyoor Thazhe School)

Masjids
 Cheekkonnu Salafi Masjid
 Kandothkuni Juma Masjid
 Nambiythamkundu Juma Masjid
 Kizhakedathvayal Masjid (Kunjippalli)
 Masjidu Thaqva thinoor
 Thazhe Narippatta(cherukavil Palli)
 Mandokandy juma masjid 
 mullambath masjid
 CP Muck Juma Masjid

Temples
 sree shankara narayana kshetram Thinoor
sree muthappan kshethram irumbamthadam
 Moyiloth Sree Paradevatha - Bhadrakali Temple (Arayakkool)
 sree muthappan temble payyekandy kumbalachola
sree subramanya swami temble payyekandy
sree ayyappa bhajana madam eendhumkade 
sree puzhayoram bhadhrakali temble thaniyullapoyil
Neerveli temple tazhe narippatta

Transportation
Naripata village connects to other parts of India through Vatakara town on the west and Kuttiady town on the east.  National highway No.66 passes through Vatakara and the northern stretch connects to Mangalore, Goa and Mumbai.  The southern stretch connects to Cochin and Trivandrum.  The eastern National Highway No.54 going through Kuttiady connects to Mananthavady, Mysore and Bangalore. The nearest airports are at Kannur and Kozhikode.  The nearest railway station is at Vatakara. There are many public transportation menas to reach Narippetta, like bus service and jeep service. The Private bus and KSRTC bus routes are there from Kozhikode to Kaiveli(via, Kuttaidy), Kozhikode - Kaiveli (via Vadakara). The jeep services are available from Kuttaidy and Kakkattil.

Achievements
Narippatta Grama Panchayat is an ISO 9001:2015 certified panchayth. (certificate No. TQS/Q-328)
The panchayath has won certificate of recognition and momento for 100% tax collection from the Respected minister for Local self Governance for  the economic year 2017-18
Narippatta Grama Panchayat has won the second prize in the category Sampoorna Jaivakarshika Mandalam Award in Kozhikode Dist for the outstanding performance under Organic farming programme.
 Narippatta Grama Panchayat has been appreciated for collecting 100% taxation for consecutive four years from 2017-18 to 2020-21.
 Narippatta Family Health Center, has received Kozhikode district first in Kayakalp Awards for 2021. Family health center was also awarded by DMO (H) Kozhikode for outstanding performance by a Health Center, for 2021.

References

Villages in Kozhikode district
Kuttiady area